Rebecca Walker Steele (October 18, 1925 - January 12, 2019) was an American musician and educator. She was known for her singing and for her choral direction. Steele directed choirs at Florida A&M University and  Bethune-Cookman College.

Biography 
Steele was born on October 18, 1925, in Lakeland, Florida. She showed early musical talent, performing in her grandfather's church at age 4. Her parents encouraged her in pursuing music and made she had the "best possible training." She attended the Rochelle High School and earned an associate degree from Florida Memorial College. Steele graduated with a bachelor's degree from Alabama State University (ASU), where she studied piano under Hazel Harrison. She earned master's degrees in voice, piano, choral conducting and also in music education from Columbia University. Steele earned her Ph.D. in 1973 from Florida State University, where she specialized in multicultural music education.

While she was in New York City, she "was in great demand as a singer." Steele worked as the university choir director at Florida A&M University (FAMU) where she was in charge of one of Tallahassee's first "multiracial choirs." Steel worked at FAMU between 1947 until 1976, when she went on to become a faculty member at Bethune-Cookman College. Steele retired from Bethune-Cookman in 2013. As a choir director, her choral groups performed across the United States and were "constantly in demand."

Steele died on January 12, 2019.

References

External links 
Bethune-Cookman College Male Glee Club singing The 23rd Psalm under the direction of Dr. Steele
Dr. Steele Tribute

1925 births
2019 deaths
American choral conductors
People from Lakeland, Florida
Florida Memorial University
Alabama State University alumni
Columbia University alumni
Florida State University alumni
Florida A&M University faculty
Bethune–Cookman University people
American women academics
20th-century African-American women singers